Natan'el al-Fayyumi (also known as Nathanel ben Fayyumi), born about 1090 – died about 1165, of Yemen was the twelfth-century author of Bustan al-Uqul (Hebrew: Gan HaSikhlim; Garden of the Intellects), a Jewish version of Ismaili Shi'i doctrines, and a complete imitation of Bahya ibn Paquda's book, Duties of the Heart, and which Al-Fayyumi composed, in his own words, to counter some of the basic principles and tenets of Judaism expressed by Ibn Paquda, writing in his 3rd chapter that God's unity is far greater than that described by Ibn Paquda. Like the Ismailis, Natan'el argued that God sent different prophets to the various nations of the world, containing legislations suited to the particular temperament of each individual nation. Each people should remain loyal to its own religion, because the universal teaching was adapted to the specific conditions and experiences of each community. Not all Jewish depictions of Muhammad were negative. Jews who lived in environments governed by Ismailis did not view them as enemies, and vice versa.

Nathanel explicitly considered Muhammad a true prophet, who was sent from Heaven with a particular message that applies to the Arabs, but not to the Jews. Marc B. Shapiro has written that Rabbi Jonathan Sacks's pluralistic views on religion are supported by al-Fayyumi. However, al-Fayyumi's explicit acceptance of Muhammad's prophecy may be unique and was virtually unknown until recent times beyond his native Yemen. Rabbi Yosef Qafih, the editor and translator of Fayyumi's Judeo-Arabic Bustan al-Uqul, asserts that due to Muslim attempts to catch Jews saying something against their faith–one who said that Muhammad was a false prophet would be judged for death–Nathanel was compelled to teach his people arguments and responses that would save them from ensnarement.

Ismaili teachings speak of an evolutionary sequence of prophetic revelations, which will culminate in the era of the messianic al-Qa'im, who will unite all humanity in acknowledging God. Ismaili doctrine acknowledges that a single universal religious truth lies at the root of the different religions and that each of the historical revelations plays a role in preparing the path for that universal truth.

There were Jews, such as Natan'el, who accepted this model of religious pluralism, leading them to view Muhammad as a legitimate prophet, albeit not Jewish, sent to preach to the Arabs, just as the Hebrew prophets had been sent to deliver their messages to Israel.

Within a single generation, Natan'el's son Yaqub was compelled to turn to Maimonides, asking urgently for counsel on how to deal with a new wave of religious persecutions and forced conversions that was threatening the Jews of Yemen, an exchange which prompted Maimonides to compose his famous Epistle to Yemen. The letters and intellectual dialogue between Yaqub, Maimonides and Saladin had a lasting effect upon the Yemenite Jews.

Etymology 
There is a dispute between Rabbi Yosef Qafih and historian Yehuda Ratzaby as to the origin of the name "Fayyumi." According to Ratzaby, "al-Fayyumi" is gentilic, derived from the name of his ancestors' place of origin, who are thought to have come from Fayyum in Egypt. Qafih, dissenting, thinks the name to be only a given name to the father of Rabbi Natan'el who was named "Fayyumi," the name that many children in Yemen were then affectionately called-by, owing to the love the people had for Rabbi Saadia Gaon al-Fayyumi.

See also

 Judaism's view of Muhammad
 Judaism and Islam
 Religious pluralism

References

Yemenite Jews
Jewish writers
Year of death unknown
Year of birth unknown
Philosophers of Judaism
Medieval Jewish writers
1090s births
1160s deaths
1165 deaths
12th-century Jewish theologians
Judeo-Arabic writers